Zanthoxylum atchoum (synonym Fagara atchoum) is a forest tree in the family Rutaceae that grows in Côte d'Ivoire's Eastern Guinean forests. It is endemic to Côte d'Ivoire where it is threatened by habitat loss.  Waterman assigned Z. atchoum to this combination after morphological and secondary metabolite evidence revealed that Fagara should be subsumed in Zanthoxylum.

References

atchoum
Endemic flora of Ivory Coast
Trees of Africa
Vulnerable flora of Africa
Taxonomy articles created by Polbot